Loch Maree  is a loch in Wester Ross in the Northwest Highlands of Scotland.

Loch Maree contains five large wooded islands and over 60 smaller ones, many of which have their own lochans. The largest island, Eilean Sùbhainn, contains a loch that itself contains an island, a situation that occurs nowhere else in Great Britain. Isle Maree holds the remains of a chapel believed to be the 8th century hermitage of Saint Máel Ruba (d. 722), who founded the monastery of Applecross in 672.  It is after him that Loch Maree is named; prior to the saint's arrival in the area the loch is believed to have been named Loch Ewe, as evidenced by the name of the village of Kinlochewe (meaning "Head of Loch Ewe") which is located at the eastern end of Loch Ewe.

The loch is important for wildlife. It is the site of one of the largest breeding concentrations of black-throated diver in Great Britain, and also hold an important population of otter. The islands of Loch Maree are the location of some of the best native Caledonian pinewood in Scotland, and are particularly noted for their dragonflies, with 12 species having been recorded. The waters, islands and shoreline of Loch Maree are protected by several overlapping conservation designations.

Geography

Loch Maree is much longer than it is wide, stretching along a northwest-southeast axis. The outflow is via the short River Ewe, through which water enters the sea loch of Loch Ewe, close to the village of Poolewe; the village of Kinlochewe lies at the head of the loch at the southeastern end. The A832 road between the two runs along much of the southwestern shore of the loch, but diverges from it in the north to run via Gairloch, along the coast from Poolewe.

Loch Maree is divided into three main basins, and has many islands: the ratio of the area of the islands to the area of the surface water is greater than any other large loch in Scotland. To the northwest of this basin lies the Slattadale Basin, which contains the majority of the islands. North of the islands lies a shallower area, separating the Slattadale Basin from the Ardlair Basin, the most irregularly shaped of the three.

It is composed mainly of Torridonian sandstone of Precambrian age, lying on a bedrock of Lewisian gneiss. It is popular for hill walking, scrambling and climbing. Other peaks on the northern side include Beinn Àirigh Charr and Beinn Làir, both of which are classified as Corbetts. The entire length of the northeastern shore of Loch Maree forms part of the  Letterewe, Heights of Kinlochewe & Tournaig Estate, which extends north over an area known as the Fisherfield Forest. The southwestern side of Loch Maree is also mountainous, comprising the Torridon Forest. The most prominent peak is Beinn Eighe, which is capped with white quartzite. Three main landowners occupy the southwestern shore: from south to north these are NatureScot (the Beinn Eighe National Nature Reserve), the  Grudie & Talladale Estate, and the  Gairloch (Flowerdale & Shieldaig) & Conon Estate.

History

Between 671 and 722 Máel Ruba arrived at Loch Maree, and founded a chapel on Isle Maree. Remains of this chapel were reportedly still visible in 1861 but no traces now remain, although the burial ground associated with the chapel is still extant. A small covered well on the island is said to have been consecrated by the saint.

During the middle ages the island of Eilean Ghrùididh on Loch Maree was a centre for the MacBeaths; in or shortly after 1430 the MacBeaths were displaced by Clan MacLeod. Investigation of the island in 1965 found a fortified area measuring 44 by 36 metres with walls 1 m thick and 2 m high, with a 1.8 m deep dungeon in the southeast corner. No buildings were found within the fortifications.

Due to its remote location there is now little industry surrounding Loch Maree, however the area was formerly a centre for ironworking.  During the seventeenth century up to 8 hectares of oak woodlands a day were turned into charcoal to fuel the smelting of bog iron at Letterewe on the northeast shore. Workmen from these iron furnaces are said to have been buried on Isle Maree. Remains of one iron furnace can be seen at a site known as the Red Smiddy on the northeast bank of the River Ewe between the outflow from the loch and Poolewe. Pieces of ore, slag and iron have been found at this site.

The loch became a popular spot for trout fishing after Queen Victoria visited the Loch Maree Hotel at Talladale in 1877, a visit which led to the naming of Victoria Falls, an attractive waterfall in the vicinity of the hotel. In 1893, there was a proposal to build a branch railway from Achnasheen to Aultbea along the south shore of Loch Maree. The railway would have increased Victorian tourist traffic, as well as providing a service for fisheries and the mail and a connection to Stornoway, however the plan was later abandoned.

Ecology
Loch Maree is of international importance for its special wildlife and biodiversity, and is the site of one of the largest breeding concentrations of black-throated diver in Great Britain.

Sea trout and salmon are an important part of the loch's ecosystem, providing food for black-throated diver and otter (Lutra lutra): juvenile trout can be an important part of the diet of black-throated diver. Until recently, thousands of adult sea trout (seagoing brown trout Salmo trutta) and salmon (Salmo salar) returned to the loch from the sea every summer. Sea trout gathered in huge numbers in certain bays, providing some of the most exciting angling in Scotland for which the loch had an international reputation. The sea trout fishery collapsed in the 1980s and 1990s. The loch also has two separate populations of Arctic charr (Salvelinus alpinus) about which little is known. One form of charr, with a big eye which feeds on the bottom in deep water matures at less than 15 cm. The other form grows to over 32 cm and can sometimes be seen in shoals ruffling the surface when the loch is calm.

The islands of Loch Maree are wooded, being the location of some of the best native Caledonian pinewood in Scotland. These woodlands, along with others in Wester Ross, are genetically distinct from other pinewoods in Scotland, showing more similarity to those in southern Europe. It is thought that this results from the fact that western Scotland became ice-free first at the end of the last ice-age, allowing pine to move north along the western fringe of Europe. Pines reached Eastern Scotland from more northerly areas during a later period, as the ice sheets retreated further. Scots pine are the dominant species in these woodlands, however other tree species such as rock whitebeam and juniper are also present. The islands of Loch Maree are particularly noted for their dragonflies, with 12 species having been recorded, including the northern emerald, azure hawker and white-faced darter. Pine martens and white-tailed sea eagles can be found on the islands, which are also a breeding site for redwings; greylag geese were known to breed here in the past, but have not done so since the 1970s.

Conservation designations

The presence of black-throated divers on the loch has led to it being designated as Special Protection Area (SPA) under the EU Habitats Directive. The loch is also designated as a Special Area of Conservation (SAC), forming part of the Loch Maree Complex SAC, which extends to cover the surrounding hills including Beinn Eighe.

Over 60 islands within the loch are designated as the Loch Maree Islands National Nature Reserve (NNR), which has since 2014 been jointly managed with the neighbouring Beinn Eighe NNR as a single reserve. The Beinn Eighe and Loch Maree Islands NNR forms part of the designated Core Zone of the Wester Ross UNESCO Biosphere reserve.

Loch Maree is classified as a Category IV protected area by the International Union for Conservation of Nature, and has been designated as a Ramsar site since 19 September 1994. It is also a Site of Special Scientific Interest (SSSI), and lies within the Wester Ross national scenic area.

In media
Button-box accordionist, Fergie MacDonald topped the Scottish pop charts in 1966 with the tune "Loch Maree Islands" which pays tribute to the views of the loch, and vocal versions have been recorded by many artists over the years, notably Calum Kennedy. More recently a version of the song was included on Peat and Diesel's 2019 album Uptown Fank.

In the 2009-10 series of the BBC's Natural World, episode 6, Highland Haven, stayed closer to home than usual, with a year-long look at the environment and wildlife of Loch Maree and its surroundings.

Loch Maree and its islands, including Isle Maree, Juniper and Rough Islands are the setting of Oscar de Muriel's 2018 historical-crime novel Loch of the Dead, the fourth book in his Frey & McGray series.

Loch Maree is mentioned in the Runrig song "The Summer Walkers" from the album The Stamping Ground.

And it's up by the Shin
And up by the 'NaverAnd the long winding shores Of Loch MareeBy Ben Hope and Ben LoyalStack and by ArkleThe road reaches farNow the summer is hereFolklore
Thomas Pennant, writing in 1772, recorded that the waters of the loch were thought to have curative effects, with being submerged in the water thought to be a cure for lunacy.

Isle Maree holds an oak wish tree made famous by a visit in 1877 by Queen Victoria mentioned in her published diaries. The tree, and others surrounding it, are festooned with hammered-in coins.  It is near the healing well of St. Máel Rubha, to which votive offerings were made, including the sacrifice of bulls, which continued up to the 18th century, according to records, leading to speculation that the island was a place of pre-Christian pagan worship which was taken over by the saint. The same island contains ancient stands of oak and holly which have been linked with ancient Scottish druids.

Like Loch Ness, Loch Maree has its own monster in the form of the muc-sheilch''.

References

Sources

 
 
 

Lochs of Highland (council area)
Ross and Cromarty
Ramsar sites in Scotland
Sites of Special Scientific Interest in South Wester Ross and Cromarty
Loch Maree
Protected areas of Highland (council area)
Freshwater lochs of Scotland